The Norwegian General Post Directorate was a Norwegian government agency responsible for postal affairs. It was established in 1857 under the Norwegian Ministry of the Interior, itself non-existent today, and dissolved already in 1860 when its tasks were transferred to the Norwegian Ministry of Postal Affairs.

Its director from 1857 to 1860 was Niels Mathias Rye.

References

General Post Directorate
Postal system of Norway
1857 establishments in Norway